Dulhan Wahi Jo Piya Man Bhaye is a 1977 Hindi musical drama film. Produced by Tarachand Barjatya for Rajshri, the film is directed by Lekh Tandon. The film stars Prem Krishen, Rameshwari, Madan Puri, Jagdeep and Iftekhar. It was a surprise hit of the year and gave Madan Puri his most satisfactory film role. The music is by Ravindra Jain who also marked his singing debut with Achra Mein Phoolwa Leke song. The film has the same storyline as Tamasha (1952 film) and 1941 Hollywood film It Started with Eve. The movie was remade in Tamil as Marumagal.

Cast

Rameshwari as Kammo/ fake Rita
Prem Krishen as Prem
Madan Puri as Seth Harikrishan, Prem's grandfather
Shyamlee as Rita
Iftekhar as Dr. Farid
Leela Mishra as housekeeper
Shashikala as Mrs. Saxena, Rita's mother
Viju Khote as traffic Iminspector
Jagdeep as Jagdish, company PRO
Savita Bajaj as Sethji's nurse
Sunder as Sethji's domestic help

Plot
Seth Harikrishan, the industrialist had as his heir, his only grandson Prem. The grandfather's only desire was to see the bride of his grandson. When he fell seriously ill, his friend and doctor Farid prevailed upon Prem to bring his girl friend Rita, whom he wanted to marry. But as luck would have it, Rita had gone away to Srinagar to participate in a fashion show and she could not return, as due to snowfall all roads were blocked and air service was suspended. To satisfy his dying grandfather, Prem suggested to his company's Public Relations Officer Jagdish to hire a model girl who could pose as Rita for some time. Instead, Jagdish brought an illiterate flower seller girl Kammo, with whom Prem and his sweetheart Rita had many altercations. Kammo settles into the house and wins over Seth Harikrishan and to a degree, even Prem.
But soon Rita returns, followed by her scheming mercenary mother played by Shashikala. Yet all their forced efforts to win the grandfather's favours fail. Ultimately, on his birthday, Shashikala exposes Kammo's humble background to Dr. Farid. At the party, the flower girl's true identity becomes apparent to everyone. Despite this, Seth Harikrishan announces Prem's engagement to "Rita" (flower girl Kammo), whom he had really liked. An enraged Prem threatens to leave the house along with his girlfriend and her mother. The grandfather does not stop him. Prem rushes to Rita but is shocked to find that without the cushion of his family's wealth, his love and sacrifice hold no meaning for her or her mother. Meanwhile, Kammo, hurt and disillusioned, decides to leave the house for good. Prem realises his mistake and accepts Kammo as his bride.

Awards
Filmfare Best Dialogue Award - Vrajendra Gaur
Filmfare Best Screenplay Award - Lekh Tandon, Vrajendra Gaur, Madhusudan Kalekar

Soundtrack

Ravindra Jain is the lyricist and composer for all songs.

References

External links
 

1977 films
1970s Hindi-language films
Films about Indian weddings
Films directed by Lekh Tandon
Films scored by Ravindra Jain
Rajshri Productions films
Indian drama films
Hindi films remade in other languages
1977 drama films
Hindi-language drama films